The Very Best of Jean-Luc Ponty is a compilation album by French jazz fusion artist Jean-Luc Ponty, released in 2000. It mainly focuses on his work while on the Atlantic label.

Track listing 
All songs by Jean-Luc Ponty.
 "Bowing-Bowing" – 4:53
 "Aurora, Pt. 2" – 6:15
 "Renaissance" – 5:48
 "New Country" – 3:10
 "Enigmatic Ocean, Pt. 3" – 3:37
 "Mirage" – 4:54
 "Egocentric Molecules" – 5:49
 "Cosmic Messenger" – 4:41
 "I Only Feel Good With You" – 3:18
 "No Strings Attached" (live) – 6:02
 "A Taste for Passion" – 5:25
 "Forms of Life" – 4:50
 "Rhythms of Hope" – 4:03
 "Final Truth, Pt. 1" – 4:54
 "Individual Choice" – 4:56
 "Infinite Pursuit" – 5:59

Personnel
Jean-Luc Ponty – violin, autoharp, keyboards, electronic percussion, violectra
Chris Rhyne – synthesizer, piano, synthesizer bass
Patrice Rushen – organ, synthesizer, piano, clavichord, clavinet
Allan Zavod – keyboards, clavinet
Jamie Glaser – guitar
Scott Henderson – guitar
Allan Holdsworth – guitar
Joaquin Lievano – guitar, guitar synth
Peter Maunu – guitar, guitar synth
Dan Sawyer – guitar
Daryl Stuermer – guitar
Ralphe Armstrong – bass
Baron Browne – bass
Tom Fowler – bass
Randy Jackson – bass
Leon "Ndugu" Chancler – drums, percussion
Mark Craney – drums, percussion
Rayford Griffin – drums, percussion
Norman Fearrington – drums, percussion
Casey Scheuerell – drums, percussion
Steve Smith – drums, percussion
Paulinho Da Costa – percussion

References

2000 greatest hits albums
Jean-Luc Ponty albums
Rhino Records compilation albums